Bigotites is strongly ribbed, round-whorled perisphinctid ammonitic cephalopod from the middle Jurassic with a smooth band along the outer edge of the shell.

References
Notes

Bibliography
 Treatise on Invertebrate Paleontology, Part L; Ch. Mesozoic Ammonoidea. Geological Soc of America and U Kansas Press, R.C Moore (ed)

Jurassic ammonites
Fossils of Great Britain
Bajocian life
Ammonitida genera
Perisphinctidae